Edward James Livernash, subsequently Edward James de Nivernais (February 14, 1866 – June 1, 1938), was an American newspaperman and lawyer who served one term as a U.S. Representative representing the fourth congressional district of California from 1903 to 1905.

Late in life Livernash adopted the French form of the family name, de Nivernais, by decree of court.

Biography 
Livernash was born in Lower Calaveritas, a California mining camp near San Andreas, to an Irish mother and a father of French-Canadian descent, and attended the common schools of California. He became a printer at the age of fifteen, and a year later founded a country newspaper at Cloverdale, California. He studied law in preparation for journalism, and in 1887 was admitted to the California bar. In 1891, he joined the staff of the San Francisco Examiner and held various editorial posts there.

In 1897 Livernash was sent by the Klondike miners as commissioner to the Dominion of Canada to urge a modification of onerous laws.

in 1904, Livernash ran for Congress to represent California's 4th congressional district (San Francisco) in the Fifty-eighth Congress (March 4, 1903 – March 3, 1905) on a Democratic and Union Labor ticket. The dual nomination was unusual, and under then-prevailing California law, Livernash was required to choose which nomination would appear on the ballot; however, in October 1902 the California Supreme Court held that the provision limiting the ballot entry to a single nomination was not valid, and allowed both designations to appear.

Livernash's opponents in the election were the incumbent, Republican Julius Kahn; Socialist Party candidate William Costly; and Prohibition Party candidate Joseph Rowell. Livernash received 16,146 (49.17%) of the votes cast, compared to 16,005 (48.74%) cast for Kahn, with Costly and Rowell picking up the remaining 2.09%.  Kahn contested the election, charging that many of the votes in Livernash's plurality were illegally cast, but the election was upheld.

Livernash served only one term, losing his reelection bid to Kahn in 1904.

Later career and death 
He became the managing editor of the Rocky Mountain News in 1906, but resigned after only thirteen weeks after coming under criticism from Senator Thomas M. Patterson for an editorial published in December 1906.

Livernash resided in France from 1909 to 1912, when he returned to the United States and settled near Belmont, California. He engaged in study and literary pursuits.

Livernash died in Agnew, California on June 1, 1938. His remains were cremated at Cypress Lawn Cemetery in Colma, California.

References

External links
 

1866 births
1938 deaths
19th-century American journalists
20th-century American journalists
American male journalists
20th-century American politicians
American newspaper journalists
American expatriates in France
American people of French-Canadian descent
American people of Irish descent
Democratic Party members of the United States House of Representatives from California
San Francisco Examiner people
People of the Klondike Gold Rush
People from Cloverdale, California
People from Belmont, California
Politicians from San Francisco